Jerrod Laventure (born January 15, 1983 in Middle Island, New York) is an American-born Haitian footballer currently playing for Jersey Express in the USL Premier Development League.

Career

College
Laventure played college soccer at Seton Hall University, where in four seasons he scored 14 goals and assisted on 12. He was named to the Big East first team after recording eight goals and six assists in 2004. After his senior season he was invited to the 2005 MLS Player Combine which led to him joining the MetroStars reserve team.

Professional
Laventure signed a developmental contract with the New York Red Bulls on April 12, 2006. He made his MLS debut July 8, 2006 as a substitute in a game against FC Dallas, and scored his first professional goal on July 19, 2006 - a spectacular 30-yard chip over Columbus Crew goalkeeper Noah Palmer which won him the Goal of the Week Award. Laventure started his first game for the Red Bulls against the Wilmington Hammerheads of the USL Second Division in the U.S. Open Cup.

Laventure was released by the Red Bulls on March 17, 2008, and subsequently joined Newark Ironbound Express in the USL Premier Development League for the 2008 PDL season. Laventure scored 9 goals in 13 games in his first season for Ironbound, helping the team reach the post-season playoffs at the first attempt.

International
In 2007, Laventure was called up to the Haitian national team, but did not play for the country. In 2008, he was called up again, and started two matches against El Salvador in Port-au-Prince, Haiti.

Personal
In November 2006 he, along with his then-New York Red Bulls team mates Seth Stammler and Jozy Altidore,  accompanied Haitian-born Grammy Award winning musician Wyclef Jean on a six-day service trip to Haiti for Jean's charitable organization, Yéle Haiti.

References

External links
Player profile - MLSnet
 Player profile - MetroFanatic

1983 births
Living people
Haitian footballers
Haiti international footballers
American sportspeople of Haitian descent
American soccer players
Seton Hall Pirates men's soccer players
New York Red Bulls players
Jersey Express S.C. players
Major League Soccer players
USL League Two players
Association football forwards